BHL Tower is a commercial skyscraper within the city of George Town in Penang, Malaysia.

Aside from hosting a branch of CIMB Bank, BHL Tower also houses the Consulate-General of Japan in Penang.

History
BHL Tower, completed in 1995, is one of the oldest skyscrapers along Northam Road after the nearby MBf Tower. It originally served as the regional office of BHL Bank, which was later merged with other banks to form its successor, CIMB. To this day, CIMB maintains a branch within the structure.

See also
 List of tallest buildings in George Town
 Northam Road

References

External links
 Consulate-General of Japan in Penang

Office buildings in Penang
Buildings and structures in George Town, Penang
Skyscraper office buildings in Malaysia
Malyasia
Japan
Japan–Malaysia relations
Commercial buildings completed in 1995
1995 establishments in Malaysia
20th-century architecture in Malaysia